Glenn Littlejohn is a Canadian politician in Newfoundland and Labrador, Canada. Littlejohn was elected to the Newfoundland and Labrador House of Assembly in the 2011 provincial election until his defeat in the 2015 election. A member of the Progressive Conservative Party, he represented the electoral district of Port de Grave.

Littlejohn had previously contested the district unsuccessfully in the 2007 provincial election. Prior to his election, he also served as Mayor of Bay Roberts.

Following his electoral defeat, Littlejohn worked in the Opposition Office for a period of time. He contested the 2019 provincial election in Harbour Grace-Port de Grave, but was defeated by Liberal incumbent Pam Parsons.

Electoral record

|-

|-

|-

|}

|-

|-

|-

|NDP
|Sarah Downey	
|align="right"|396
|align="right"|6.53%
|align="right"|
|}

|-

|-

|-

|NDP
|Randy Wayne Dawe
|align="right"|162
|align="right"|2.47%
|align="right"|
|}

References

Living people
Progressive Conservative Party of Newfoundland and Labrador MHAs
21st-century Canadian politicians
People from Bay Roberts
Year of birth missing (living people)
Newfoundland and Labrador municipal councillors